Yuriy Bohdanovych Derevyanko (born 7 May 1973) is a Ukrainian entrepreneur and politician. People's Deputy of Ukraine of the VIIth and VIIIth convocations. Derevyanko was a member of the Verkhovna Rada Committee on Corruption Prevention and Counteraction. He is a member of the Council of Volia party.

Derevyanko attended Kyiv National Economic University, graduating with a master's degree in accounting and auditing in 1996.

From 2010 to 2012 he was a deputy of the Ivano-Frankivsk Oblast Council.

In the 2012 Ukrainian parliamentary election Derevyanko was an independent candidate in constituency 87 located in his birthplace Nadvirna, he was elected with 41.53%.

In the 2014 Ukrainian parliamentary election Derevyanko was again a candidate in constituency 87 for Volia, this time he was reelected to parliament with 69.67%.

Derevyanko was a candidate for President of Ukraine in the 2019 election. He was not elected, with 0.10% in the first round of the election.

Derevyanko did not participate in the 2019 Ukrainian parliamentary election.

References

External links

Dovidka 
Campaign website 

1973 births
Living people
People from Nadvirna
Kyiv National Economic University alumni
Seventh convocation members of the Verkhovna Rada
Eighth convocation members of the Verkhovna Rada
Party of Industrialists and Entrepreneurs of Ukraine politicians
Front for Change (Ukraine) politicians
Liberty (political party) politicians
Movement of New Forces politicians
Candidates in the 2019 Ukrainian presidential election